This is a glossary of terms relating to computer graphics.

For more general computer hardware terms, see glossary of computer hardware terms.

0–9

A

B

C

D

E

F

G

H

I

K

L

M

N

O

P

Q

R

S

T

U

V

W

Z

References 

Computer graphics
Video game graphics
Graphics
Wikipedia glossaries using description lists